The Senate is the upper house of Haiti's bicameral legislature, the Haitian Parliament. The lower house of the Haitian Parliament is the Chamber of Deputies. The Senate consists of thirty seats, with three members from each of the ten administrative departments. Prior to the creation of the department of Nippes in 2003, there were twenty-seven seats. Senators are elected by popular vote to six-year terms, with one-third elected every two years. There are no term limits for Senators; they may be re-elected indefinitely.

After the elections of 2000, twenty-six of the then twenty-seven seats were held by Jean-Bertrand Aristide's Fanmi Lavalas party. The Senate was not in session following the overthrow of Aristide's government in February 2004. An interim government was put in place following the rebellion, and the remaining Senators were not recognised during that time. The Senate was re-established and elections were held on 21 April 2006. The next elections were scheduled to occur in 2008, when one-third of the Senate seats was opened.

In 2015, the Senate was reduced to only 10 members and the chamber of deputies was closed because the elections to replace one-third of the senators and all of the deputies in 2013 were delayed indefinitely causing senators and deputies to finish their term in January 2015 without any replacement. This led to a dysfunctional National assembly. In the 2015 parliamentary elections these two-thirds were filled with new elected members, completing the 30 senators.

In January 2020, the number of lawmakers retaining their Senate seats was again reduced to 10 as President Jovenel Moïse failed to hold elections in time to replace the others, whose terms expired before his assassination. Following the expiration of the terms of these remaining senators on 10 January 2023, Haiti has no elected members of either chamber of its Parliament.

Latest election

List of Senate Presidents 
Le Président du Sénat

See also 
 List of current members of the Parliament of Haiti

References

Sources 

 
 

Haiti
Government of Haiti
1806 establishments in Haiti